St Kilda Botanical Gardens are a botanical garden located in the suburb St Kilda, Victoria, Australia. Located on the former site of a gravel pit and rubbish dump, they were formally gazetted on 28 September 1859 and opened in 1861.

In October 2010 City of Port Phillip provided funds for the design of four distinctive new gates, to celebrate the gardens' 150th anniversary.  The gates were installed on Tennyson, Dickens and Herbert Streets.  They were designed and sculpted by designer/blacksmith David Wood of Bent Metal.

In 1948 the Alister Clark Memorial Rose Garden was opened; in 1985 it was redesigned in its current style.  At one time the Alister Clark garden contained a large selection of roses bred by him, but only a few remain, crowded out by David Austin ones. This garden should not be confused with the comprehensive Alister Clark Memorial Rose Garden at Bulla, north of Melbourne.

The ornamental pond near the sub-tropical rainforest conservatory is being refurbished. At the same time, St Kilda Rain Man, designed by Corey Thomas and Ken Arnold and installed in 2005 will be repaired.  Rain Man fountain is solar powered and uses recycled water from the pond below.

References

External links
Friends of the St Kilda Botanical Gardens
The Ecocentre
Bent Metal

Parks in Melbourne
Botanical gardens in Victoria (Australia)
1859 establishments in Australia
Botanical Gardens
City of Port Phillip